Fashionphile is an online fashion resale website where consumers can buy and sell women’s luxury designer used handbags, accessories and jewelry. Fashionphile has brick-and-mortar locations in Beverly Hills, San Francisco, New York City and Carlsbad, California.

History
Fashionphile was founded by Sarah Davis in 1999. She started the business while she was in a law school. In 2006, Davis partnered up with her brother-in-law Ben Hemminger to expand the business and moved it to Beverly Hills, California. They originally sold pre-owned luxury handbags on eBay, and in 2007 launched a website to sell the products. In 2008, they opened their first store space off Rodeo Drive and Wilshire Blvd in Beverly Hills. The company’s growth drove its next move shortly afterwards to open their new store on Maiden Lane in San Francisco in 2009. In 2011, Fashionphile moved to their current Maiden location. In 2012, Fashionphile opened a warehouse headquarters in Carlsbad, California. In 2017, Fashionphile was awarded 50 Best Workplaces by The Silicon Review.

References

Companies based in Carlsbad, California
American companies established in 1999
Retail companies established in 1999
Online marketplaces of the United States